The Fox Theatre, Westwood Village, also known as the Fox Village Theatre, is a historic, landmark cinema in Westwood, Los Angeles, California. Westwood Village, in the heart of Westwood, is near the University of California, Los Angeles UCLA. It is currently operated by Regency Theaters under the name Regency Village Theatre. The Fox is one of the leading film premiere theaters.

History
Designed by architect Percy Parke Lewis, the Fox was originally built in 1930 and first opened on August 14, 1931, with a Spanish Mission style to it. The theatre was part of a widespread cinema construction program undertaken by Fox West Coast Theatres. The Fox Theatre quickly became the most recognizable symbol of the new Westwood Village, a Mediterranean-style village development adjoining the University of California Los Angeles planned by Harold and Edwin Janss of the Janss Investment Company.

It was remodeled in the late 1940s to the early 1950s. It became famous for the many Hollywood movie premieres held there and remains one of the main venues for movie premieres in Los Angeles.

National General Theatres, the former Fox Theatres-West Coast, sold the theater to Ted Mann, then owner of the Chinese Theatre, and it became part of the Mann Theatres chain.

In 1988, the Fox Theatre was designated by the Los Angeles Cultural Heritage Commission as an Historic Cultural Monument (HCM #362).

When Mann Theatres went out of business, Regency Theatres purchased both the Village Theatre and a multiplex cinema at "The Plant" in Van Nuys, California in 2010.

With ongoing efforts to revitalize Westwood Village, the Fox Theatre continues to be a major drawcard and asset for the area.

Architectural features

The most striking feature of the Fox Theater is the iconic 170-foot white Spanish Revival/Moderne tower which looms over the Broxton and Weyburn Avenues intersection. Atop the tower is a blue and white metal Art Deco “Fox” sign, which was renovated in the late 1980s.

Carved winged lions sit halfway up the tower at the base of projecting columns. A blue and white sign with the legend "Fox Westwood Village" is positioned at the bottom of the tower just above the entrance. By night, the elegant white tower literally becomes a beacon with its signs and the shaft of the tower illuminated.

The rectangular cinema building immediately behind the tower features long rows of Churrigueresque stucco decorations. Perched atop the corners of the building stand carved griffins.

Interior

The seating capacity of the cinema is about 1,400. The interior of the theater was remodeled during the late 1940s and early 1950s. The lobby and exits were upgraded and California Gold Rush artwork was added in the lobby. Golden flourishes were added near the stage areas.

In the late 1970s new 70mm projection equipment was installed and a larger screen added. The Fox Westwood Village has a reputation for top quality sound and projection. The most recent re-modeling was about 1998-1999 with the theater getting new seating and carpet. In 2014, Regency added the immersive Dolby Atmos sound system to the theater in time for the movie Transcendence. It remains one of the few remaining THX certified theatres in Los Angeles.

Movie premieres

A number of movie premieres have been held at the cinema, including: Robots, The Fast and the Furious, A Star Is Born, Spider-Man: No Way Home, Spider-Man: Into the Spider-Verse, Spider-Man, Spider-Man 2, James Bond films, JFK, Mission: Impossible, Batman, each Harry Potter film, Independence Day, Terminator 3: Rise of the Machines, The Emoji Movie, The Lego Movie, Shrek, Captain Underpants: The First Epic Movie, Cloudy with a Chance of Meatballs franchise, Overlord, Venom, Murder Mystery, Hairspray and hundreds of others. Typically the streets get shut down and are used for red carpet arrivals.

The 1999 music video for "Praise You" by Fatboy Slim was filmed on the sidewalk adjacent to the Fox Theater.

References

Cinemas and movie theaters in Los Angeles
Movie palaces
Westwood, Los Angeles
Los Angeles Historic-Cultural Monuments
Event venues established in 1931
Towers in California
Mediterranean Revival architecture in California